Two-Fisted Tales is an anthology war comic published bi-monthly by EC Comics in the early 1950s. The title originated in 1950 when Harvey Kurtzman suggested to William Gaines that they publish an adventure comic. Kurtzman became the editor of Two-Fisted Tales, and with the dawn of the Korean War, he soon narrowed the focus to war stories. The title was a companion comic to Frontline Combat, and stories Kurtzman wrote for both books often displayed an anti-war attitude. It returned to adventure-themed stories in issues #36 through #39, co-edited by John Severin and Colin Dawkins, with a cover-title change to The New Two-Fisted Tales.

The bimonthly title ran 24 issues, numbered 18–41, from 1950 to 1955. In 1952, EC published Two-Fisted Annual which had no new stories but instead bound together past issues of Two-Fisted Tales with a new cover by Kurtzman. The same procedure was repeated in 1953 for an annual with a new Jack Davis cover.

Years after its demise, Two-Fisted Tales was reprinted in its entirety and was adapted to television.

Publication history

Numbering 
As with many EC comics published at the time, Two-Fisted Tales did not start with issue number one; a renaming of The Haunt of Fear, Two-Fisted Tales began with issue #18 (cover-dated Dec. 1950) and ran 24 issues through #41 (March 1955). Wholesaler problems had caused Gaines to consider canceling The Haunt of Fear, but he changed his mind without skipping an issue. Two-Fisted Tales took over the numbering, and The Haunt of Fear then reverted to the correct numbering for the remainder of its run.

Development 

Kurtzman's editing approach to Two-Fisted Tales and Frontline Combat was a stark contrast to fellow EC editor Al Feldstein's style.  Whereas Feldstein allowed his artists to draw the story however they chose, Kurtzman prepared detailed layouts for each story and required his artists to follow them exactly. Kurtzman's writing tended to use less text than Feldstein's, which enabled the two war titles to be hand-lettered rather than machine-lettered like the remainder of EC's titles. Kurtzman was dedicated to making the stories as historically accurate as possible and along with assistant Jerry DeFuccio put a lot of research into each story. As a result, where Feldstein took generally about a week to complete each issue he edited, Kurtzman took approximately a month.

Change in format and demise 
Two-Fisted Tales was published with a companion title, Frontline Combat, for most of its run. Towards the end of 1953, a decrease in interest due to the end of the Korean War, as well as Kurtzman becoming overwhelmed with his work on Mad required changes to be made. Frontline Combat was dropped entirely while Two-Fisted Tales was changed from bi-monthly to quarterly publication. As sales continued to drop, Gaines was forced to fold the title. Over its four-year span, the comic ran for 24 issues, ending with issue 41, in February 1955.

Reprints 
Two-Fisted Tales has been reprinted several times. It was fully reprinted in a series of four black-and-white hardcover books by publisher Russ Cochran as part of The Complete EC Library in 1980. Between October 1992 and July 1998, Cochran, in association with Gemstone Publishing, reprinted all 24 issues. This complete run was later rebound, with covers included, in a series of five softcover EC Annuals. In 2007, Cochran and Gemstone began to publish hardcover, digitally colored volumes of Two-Fisted Tales as part of the EC Archives series. Two volumes of a projected four were published before the project fell into limbo. GC Press LLC, a boutique imprint established by Russ Cochran and Grant Geissman, announced in a September 1, 2011 press release that it is continuing the EC Archives series, and the first new releases shipped in January 2012.

Revival 
In 1993, Dark Horse Comics published two issues of Harvey Kurtzman's The New Two-Fisted Tales, featuring war stories by contemporary creators. The first was published April 1, 1993 and the last August 1, 1993. They contained four stories in both issues.

Notable creators 

Artists who contributed included Kurtzman and other EC regulars such as John Severin, Jack Davis, Wally Wood, George Evans, Will Elder, Reed Crandall and Bernard Krigstein. Non-EC regulars that contributed to the comic included Alex Toth, Ric Estrada, Gene Colan, Joe Kubert and Dave Berg.

Kurtzman wrote the majority of the book's stories from 1950 through 1953, with Jerry DeFuccio contributing one-page text stories and the occasional regular story as well. Colin Dawkins provided the writing for the majority of the stories for 1954 and 1955, with contributions from Davis, Evans and Severin. John Putnam, who scripted "Dien Bien Phu!" (#40), later became the art director of EC's Mad.

Themes

Anti-war message 
The stories Kurtzman wrote for this title often displayed an anti-war attitude. Canadian journalist Mitchell Brown wrote about the impact and influence of Kurtzman's approach: "Unlike other magazines of the day, no one could accuse Two-Fisted Tales of being wartime propaganda. On the contrary, the magazine was a brutally honest look at battles and wars throughout history. Kurtzman, who had been drafted in 1942, knew warfare firsthand, and he was outraged by the gung-ho war comics that made war look like a glorious thing. In his stories, there were no heroes—just soldiers trapped in situations beyond their control. Often, his stories weren't about soldiers at all, focusing instead on the lives of innocent people scarred by war."

Kurtzman discussed his approach to Two-Fisted Tales in a 1980 interview:

Other themes 
In addition to contemporary stories about the Korean War and World War II, Two-Fisted Tales and Frontline Combat contained a number of stories taking place in historical settings, including the Civil War, the Revolutionary War and ancient Rome.

A series of special issues dedicated to the Civil War included issues 31 and 35 of Two-Fisted Tales and issue 9 of Frontline Combat.  Although originally planned to be seven issues in total, the series was never completed.

In other media

TV film adaptation 

In 1991, the comic book was adapted for a TV film by producers Joel Silver, Richard Donner, Robert Zemeckis and others. Apart from an opening montage of covers from the comic book and use of comic's logo, the movie had little connection with Kurtzman's creation. In imitation of EC's horror books, the anthology drama featured ghostly gunfighter Mr. Rush (Bill Sadler) as a host and a device to connect the segments, although Kurtzman's war-adventure stories had never been introduced by a host. Two of the stories, "Showdown" and "King of the Road", were original scripts and not adaptations from EC (although "Showdown" did share a title with a story from issue 37). The third story, "Yellow", was adapted from a story written by Al Feldstein and illustrated by Jack Davis for the first issue of EC's Shock SuspenStories. The film had a single telecast in the USA on January 18, 1992, generating little interest, and "Showdown" and "King of the Road" were later extracted to become individual episodes of HBO's Tales From The Crypt television series ("Yellow" was exhibited as an episode in the year before).

Popular culture
Welsh drum and bass and electronic music producer and DJ Lincoln Barrett adopted the name Two Fisted Tales as a pseudonym under which to produce primarily house music tracks.

Issue guide

References

Sources
Goulart, Ron. Great American Comic Books. Publications International, Ltd., 2001. .
Overstreet, Robert M.. Official Overstreet Comic Book Price Guide. House of Collectibles, 2004.
von Bernewitz, Fred. Tales of Terror: The EC Companion. Fantagraphics Books, 2000. .

External links
The Golden Age of Comic Books podcast (January 18, 2006)

1950 comics debuts
1955 comics endings
EC Comics publications
War comics
Anti-war comics
Comics magazines published in the United States
Comics edited by Harvey Kurtzman
1950 establishments in the United States
1955 disestablishments in the United States
Magazines established in 1950
Magazines disestablished in 1955
American comics adapted into films